Frederick Hewitt (13 November 1883 – 30 May 1951) was an Australian rules footballer who played with Carlton and Melbourne in the Victorian Football League (VFL).

Notes

External links 

Fred Hewitt's profile at Blueseum

1883 births
1951 deaths
Australian rules footballers from Victoria (Australia)
Carlton Football Club players
Melbourne Football Club players